Owatonna Hospital is a non-profit regional medical center in Owatonna, Minnesota, United States that serves patients in and around Steele County, Minnesota. Owatonna Hospital provides a full range of inpatient, outpatient and emergency care services, as well as home and palliative care and hospice. It is owned by Allina Health System of Minneapolis.

New location
A new hospital opened in October 2009 at 2250 NW 26th Street in Owatonna, Minnesota. The hospital adjoins with Mayo Clinic Health System - Owatonna, to create one multi-faceted health care campus.
The former location was 903 S. Oak Ave. in Owatonna, Minnesota.

Facts
Currently Owatonna Hospital has:
 77 licensed hospital beds
 350 employees
 Owatonna Clinic-Mayo Health System practicing physicians

In 2007 Owatonna Hospital had:
 2,653 inpatient admissions
 592 births
 31,803 outpatient visits
 15000 emergency department visits
 6,399 surgeries

Accreditation
Owatonna Hospital is accredited by the Joint Commission on Accreditation of Healthcare Organizations (JCAHO)

Collective bargaining
Some service workers at the hospital are represented by the Service Employees International Union.

References

External links
Official site of Owatonna Hospital
Official site of Allina Health

Hospital buildings completed in 2009
Hospitals in Minnesota
Buildings and structures in Steele County, Minnesota